Waddingham is a village and civil parish in the West Lindsey district of Lincolnshire, England. According to the United Kingdom Census 2001 Waddingham (including Brandy Wharf) had a population of 548; by the time of the United Kingdom Census 2011, the population had increased to 601.

History
Originally there were two settlements, Stainton (where the present church is) and Wadingham, which were on either side of the Waddingham Beck which runs through the village. Both settlements are mentioned in the Domesday Book of 1086. Both places have Anglo Saxon names: Stainton is derived from The Old English "Stan" (stone), and the Old English "Tun" (farm), meaning stony farm. Waddingham is derived from two common OE suffixes: "ing" (person), or "ingas" (people), and "ham" (village or settlement), meaning the village of, or belonging to, the Wada family or tribe.

The Church of St Mary and St Peter, Waddingham (originally St Peter) church chancel arch is 13th-century, the tower being a 15th-century addition. The church was largely rebuilt in 1862.

Culture and community
Waddingham has a post office, a village shop, which closed in late August 2022 and a Methodist chapel. Opposite the  Jubilee Hall (built to commemorate HM Queen Elizabeth II's Silver Jubilee in 1977) is Waddingham Primary School. The village public house is now closed.

References

Sources

External links

St Mary & St Peter's Church web site
Waddingham Primary School web site
Waddingham Parish Council web site

Villages in Lincolnshire
Civil parishes in Lincolnshire
West Lindsey District